Ivan Fyodorov may refer to:

Ivan Fedorov (politician), born 1988, mayor of Melitopol since 2020, abducted by Russian military in March 2022
Ivan Fyodorov (printer), sixteenth century, first Eastern Slavic printer
Ivan Fyodorov (navigator), Russian navigator, commanding officer of the expedition to northern Alaska, 1732
Ivan Fyodorovich Koshkin, died 1427, Russian aristocrat

See also
Ivan Fedotov (born 1996), Russian ice hockey player